The New Zealand Post-Primary Teachers' Association Incorporated (PPTA) is a trade union in New Zealand and professional association. It represents about 20,000 teachers employed in state and integrated secondary schools, area schools, technology centres and community education centres. The PPTA is affiliated with the New Zealand Council of Trade Unions and Education International.

Notes and references

External links

New Zealand Council of Trade Unions
Education International
Trade unions in New Zealand
Education trade unions
Trade unions established in 1952